The Hump is a conspicuous dome-shaped summit on the northern shore of Lapeyrère Bay, northern Anvers Island, in the Palmer Archipelago. The name appears on a chart based on a 1927 survey by Discovery Investigations personnel on the RRS Discovery, but may reflect an earlier naming.

References

Mountains of the Palmer Archipelago